Crasilogia is a genus of moths in the family Geometridae described by Warren in 1903. It is sometimes considered a synonym of Costaconvexa.

Species
 Crasilogia dispar Warren, 1903
 Crasilogia flavipennis Warren, 1907
 Crasilogia fulvitincta Joicey & Talbot, 1917
 Crasilogia fumipennis Warren, 1906
 Crasilogia gressitti Holloway, 1984
 Crasilogia simplex (Prout, 1940)

References

Xanthorhoini